The 1927 SMU Mustangs football team was an American football team that represented the Southern Methodist University (SMU) as a member of the Southwest Conference (SWC) during the 1927 college football season. In its eighth season, under head coach Ray Morrison, the team compiled a 7–2 record and outscored opponents by a total of 267 to 81.

Schedule

References

SMU
SMU Mustangs football seasons
SMU Mustangs football